The 1930–31 Swiss International Ice Hockey Championship was the 16th edition of the international ice hockey championship in Switzerland. HC Davos won the championship by defeating HC Rosey Gstaad in the final.

First round

Eastern Series

Group 1 
Since EHC Arosa opted not to participate, only one game was played in Group 1.
 EHC St. Moritz- Lyceum Zuoz 6:0

Group 2

Semifinals 
 Zürcher SC - Akademischer EHC Zürich 4:3
 HC Davos - Akademischer EHC Zürich 5:0 Forfeit

Final 
 HC Davos - Zürcher SC 11:1

Eastern Final 
 HC Davos - EHC St. Moritz

Western Series

Semifinals 
 Lycée Jaccard - HC Chateaux-d'Oex 2:0
 HC Rosey Gstaad - Star Lausanne 11:0

3rd place game 
HC Chateaux-d'Oex - Star Lausanne 6:1

Final 
HC Rosey Gstaad-Lycée Jaccard 8:1

HC Rosey Gstaad qualified for the final.

Final 
 HC Davos - HC Rosey Gstaad 5:3

External links 
Swiss Ice Hockey Federation – All-time results

International Championship
Swiss International Ice Hockey Championship seasons